John David McWilliam (16 May 1941 – 14 November 2009) was a British Labour Party politician who served as Member of Parliament (MP) for Blaydon from 1979 until he stood down at the 2005 general election.

Early life
Born in Grangemouth, the son of Alexander McWilliam, a post office engineer, he went to Leith Academy. He later attended evening classes as a Post Office Telephones Youth in Training at Heriot-Watt Technical College and Napier College of Science and Technology.

McWilliam joined the Labour party in 1966, and prior to his election he worked as a telephone engineer, Technician 2A, for British Telecom

Parliamentary career
While a City of Edinburgh councillor, McWilliam fought Edinburgh Pentlands in February 1974, but was defeated by Malcolm Rifkind. He was subsequently elected for Blaydon at the 1979 election just as the Callaghan government left office. He served briefly as deputy shadow leader of the House of Commons, before becoming an opposition whip. He resigned from this role in 1987 in protest at the sacking of two of his colleagues. McWilliam served on the Defence Select Committee for 12 years, between 1987 and 1999.

When Betty Boothroyd retired as Speaker of the House of Commons, McWilliam  was one of the 12 candidates nominated to succeed her. In the election on 23 October 2000 he received 30 votes, the fewest of any candidate.

He stood down at the 2005 general election after 26 years as an MP, and returned to living in  Scotland where he died in November 2009.

Personal life
He married Lesley Mary Catling on 6 February 1965. They had two daughters (Ruth Lesley, born 29 February 1972 and Fiona Alexandra, born 20 June 1974) and divorced in 1992. He married Mary McLoughlin on 31 March 1994. They divorced in 1997. He married Helena Lovegreen in March 1998; that union ended in 2009, when McWilliam died.

References

External links

TheyWorkForYou.com - John McWilliam
 Ask Aristotle

News items
 Stepping down in October 2002

1941 births
2009 deaths
Labour Party (UK) MPs for English constituencies
UK MPs 1979–1983
UK MPs 1983–1987
UK MPs 1987–1992
UK MPs 1992–1997
UK MPs 1997–2001
UK MPs 2001–2005
People from Grangemouth
People educated at Leith Academy
Post Office Engineering Union-sponsored MPs